Pacific Northwest Quarterly (commonly referred to as PNQ) is a peer-reviewed academic journal of history that publishes scholarship relating to the Pacific Northwest of the United States, including Alaska, and adjacent areas of western Canada. Founded in 1906 by Edmond S. Meany as the Washington Historical Quarterly, the journal is published by the University of Washington. Editorial offices are located in the UW Department of History. By tradition, the managing editor is a professor in the department. The current managing editor is Bruce Hevly.

Editors of the Quarterly
Edmond S. Meany  1906-1935
Merrill Jensen         1936-1942
Charles M. Gates   1943-1963
Robert E. Burke     1963-1986
Lewis O. Saum       1986-1991
John M. Findlay     1991-2003, 2008-2016
W.J. Rorabaugh      2003-2008
Bruce Hevly             2016–Present

External links

 http://journals.lib.washington.edu/index.php/WHQ/issue/archive

History of the Americas journals
Area studies journals
University of Washington
American studies journals
Publications established in 1906
1906 establishments in Washington (state)